The Breeders Classic, raced as the Hot Danish Stakes is an Australian Turf Club Group 2 Thoroughbred horse race, for mares three-years old and upwards, at set weights with penalties, over a distance of 1400 metres run at Rosehill Racecourse in Sydney, Australia every November. Total prize money for the race is A$500,000.

History

The event was moved for the 2019–20 racing season to November as part of The Everest carnival and hence the event was held twice in 2019.

Distance
1996 – 1200 metres
1997 – 1250 metres
1998 – 1300 metres
1999–2003 – 1200 metres
2004 – 1180 metres 
2005–2019 (Autumn) - 1200 metres
2019 (Spring) - 1400 metres

Grade
 1996–2005 - Listed race
 2006–2007 - Group 3 
 2008 onwards - Group 2

Venue
 1996–2001 - Randwick Racecourse
 2002 - Warwick Farm Racecourse
 2003–2011 - Randwick Racecourse
 2012 - Warwick Farm Racecourse
 2013–2016 - Rosehill Gardens Racecourse
 2017 - Randwick Racecourse
 2018–2019 (Autumn) - Warwick Farm Racecourse
 2019 (Spring) - Rosehill Gardens Racecourse

Winners

 2022 - Sheeza Belter 
 2021 - Electric Girl 
 2020 - Savatiano 
 2019 (spring) - Reelem In Ruby 
 2019 (autumn) - Champagne Cuddles 
 2018 - Prompt Response   
 2017 - In Her Time   
 2016 - Amicus
 2015 - Catkins
 2014 - Catkins
 2013 - Steps In Time
 2012 - Steps In Time
 2011 - More Joyous
 2010 - Alverta
 2009 - Hot Danish
 2008 - Gallant Tess
 2007 - Pasikatera
 2006 - Steflara
 2005 - Winning Belle
 2004 - Private Steer
 2003 - Miss Helterskelter
 2002 - Gwendolyn
 2001 - Spinning Hill
 2000 - Staging
 1999 - My Halo Broke
 1998 - Arletty
 1997 - Misty Dawn
 1996 - Destruct

See also
 List of Australian Group races
 Group races

External links
 First three place getters NSW Thoroughbred Breeders Classic (ATC)

References

Horse races in Australia
Randwick Racecourse